Martinus Petrus Maria Muskens (December 11, 1935 – April 16, 2013) was the Roman Catholic bishop of the Diocese of Breda, Netherlands.

Ordained to the priesthood in 1962, Muskens was named bishop in 1994 and resigned in 2007.

Notes

1935 births
2013 deaths
20th-century Roman Catholic bishops in the Netherlands
21st-century Roman Catholic bishops in the Netherlands